Bill Harkleroad (born January 8, 1949), known professionally as Zoot Horn Rollo, is an American guitarist. He is best known for his work with Captain Beefheart and The Magic Band. In 2003, he was ranked No. 62 in a Rolling Stone magazine list of "the 100 greatest guitarists of all time".

Biography
Born in Hawthorne, California, Harkleroad was trained as an accordionist as a child but changed to guitar in his teens. In nearby Lancaster, California, he became involved in local bands. With a future member of the Magic Band, Mark Boston, he joined a band named B.C. & The Cavemen. The two later played in the group Blues in a Bottle along with the future Magic Band guitarist Jeff Cotton. He joined the Magic Band in 1968 after the departure of Alex St. Clair. After recording Trout Mask Replica and several further albums, he left in 1974, with several other band members, to form Mallard. His book, Lunar Notes, describes some of the tensions that contributed to the split between Captain Beefheart and the other band members.

After the break up of Mallard, Harkleroad had a limited involvement with the music community as a performer. He continued his involvement in another capacity, however, as a record store manager and guitar instructor in Eugene, Oregon.

On November 27, 2001, he released We Saw a Bozo Under the Sea. In 2008, John French (a.k.a. Drumbo) released an album City of Refuge on which Harkleroad played guitar on all twelve tracks. In 2013, Harkleroad contributed lead guitar to a psychobilly track on the Eugene-based band Cherry Poppin' Daddies album White Teeth, Black Thoughts.

Discography
With Captain Beefheart & His Magic Band
 1969 Trout Mask Replica
 1970 Lick My Decals Off, Baby
 1972 The Spotlight Kid
 1972 Clear Spot
 1974 Unconditionally Guaranteed

With Mallard
 1975 Mallard
 1976 In a Different Climate

Solo
 2001 We Saw a Bozo Under the Sea
 2014 Masks

Bibliography
 Harkleroad, Bill (1998). Lunar Notes: Zoot Horn Rollo's Captain Beefheart Experience. Interlink Publishing. .

References

External links
 
 HiFi Mundo interview, 1997
 Guitar Player magazine biography
 Interview in University of Oregon Voice
 Mallard (band) web pages online since 1995

1948 births
Living people
American blues guitarists
American male guitarists
American rock guitarists
The Magic Band members
GMTV presenters and reporters
Musicians from Eugene, Oregon
Musicians from Hawthorne, California
Lead guitarists
Slide guitarists
Guitarists from California
Guitarists from Oregon
20th-century American guitarists
Nicknames
Nicknames in music